Leone Airways was a planned national carrier for Sierra Leone.  It was established as a joint venture between the government of Sierra Leone and Arik Airlines of Nigeria.

References

External links

Defunct airlines of Sierra Leone